

Christopher Edward Dyko (March 16, 1966 – December 28, 2014) was an American football tackle who played eight games, starting once, for the Chicago Bears in the National Football League.  He later signed with the New York Giants, playing for the New York/New Jersey Knights, and also played in the Canadian Football League.

Dyko played college football at Washington State University in Pullman under head coaches Jim Walden and Dennis Erickson. In his senior season in 1988, the Cougars won the Aloha Bowl and finished with a 9–3 record. He was selected by the Bears in the eighth round of the 1989 NFL Draft.

Post-football career
Dyko received a Master of Education degree from WSU in 1996. He was employed by the American Military University online learning institution as its northwest regional coordinator and was an adjunct professor.

Death
While riding his bicycle in the Florida Keys in 2014, Dyko was struck and killed in a hit and run incident on December 28.

References

External links

Chris Dyko at justsportsstats.com
Obituary

1966 births
2014 deaths
Players of American football from Illinois
Players of American football from Washington (state)
American football offensive tackles
Chicago Bears players
Birmingham Barracudas players
New York/New Jersey Knights players
Sacramento Gold Miners players
People from Bremerton, Washington
People from Champaign, Illinois
Washington State University alumni
Washington State Cougars football players
Cycling road incident deaths
Road incident deaths in Florida